is an archaeological site with a large Yayoi period settlement remains, straddling the border between the municipalities of Yonago] and Daisen, Tottori Prefecture in the San'in region of western Japan. The Mukibanda site was designated a National Historic Site in 1999.

General description
The settlement was naturally protected by the foothills of Mount Daisen, yet had close access to Miho Bay on the Sea of Japan, which is clearly visible from the site.It is divided into several discreet areas along the hill ridge. Continuing excavations have confirmed the remains of more than 420 pit dwellings, more than 500 pillar-supported buildings, and more than 30 burial mounds. It is estimated that there are more than 1,000 buildings including unexplored areas, making it one of the largest settlements in the Yayoi period.

Discovery
Construction of a golf course  and large-scale "Daisen Swiss Village" resort was planned on the site in the early 1990s by the Keihan Group, but after an examination of the area by the Boards of Education of Daisen and Yodoe, now Yonago City, between 1995 and 1998, a national-level conservation movement sought to protect the area from development.The ruins cover an area of 156 hectares.

Districts
The Mukibanda Yayoi remains are divided into seven districts.

Sentani
Muki Niiyama
Mukiyama
Matsuogashira
Komaishi
Shimizu
Matsuojo

Excavation
Roughly 1/20th of the Mukibanda remains have been excavated. The  of excavation revealed 395 pit-style dwellings, 502 dwellings with raised cornerstones, and 24 Yayoi-style barrow cliff tombs. This area was inhabited between the late Yayoi to early Kofun period, roughly 100 BC to 300 AD. The east part of the site was occupied by dwellings, and the western part of the site, on higher ground, was used for gravesites. The settlement was active in blacksmithing, bead making, and the production of earthenware Yayoi pottery. The highest point on the site in the Matsuogashira district of Daisen appears to be the home of the chief of the village and home to the sacred area of the site. The entire site is thought to be the chief village, and possibly capitol, of some type of political entity.  The Mukibanda site is likely part of ancient Kingdom of Izumo The existence of ring trenches dating from the latter half of the Yayoi period indicate that the settlement was fortified at some point, roughly corresponding to the time of the Civil War of Wa mentioned in Chinese historical sources. Remains unearthed include earthenware, stone tools (cooking tools, agricultural tools, hunting tools, weapons), ironware (agricultural tools, weapons), and broken mirrors. A total of 197 ironware items from the Yayoi period, such as hatchets, axes, chisels, drilling tools, hoe tips, sickles, and iron arrowheads, have been excavated, and some of them are of continental origin.

Remains
Earthenware
Stoneware, including:
Cookware
Agricultural implements
Hunting implements
Weapons
Ironware, including:
Hoes
Spades
Plows
Sickles
Axes
Chisels
Awls
Weapons
Mirror fragments

Visiting the site
The Mukibanda remains are open to the public. Tours, demonstrations, special events, and reconstructions at the site can be seen throughout the year.

Access
The Mukibanda remains are closest to the JR West San'in Main Line Yonago Station (15 minute bus ride), but is also accessible from the JR West San'in Main and Inbi lines at Tottori Station (2 hour bus ride). The site is accessible by road via the San'in Expressway, Japan National Route 431, and Japan National Route 9.

Gallery

See also
 List of Historic Sites of Japan (Tottori)
Yayoi period

References

External links
 Muki-Banda Remains
 Mukibanda Historical Site, Yonago Tourist Site
 妻木晩田遺跡 史跡名勝記念物
 Visitors' brochure
 大阪府立弥生文化博物館 (Museum of Yayoi Culture, Osaka)

Yayoi period
Kofun period
Historic Sites of Japan
Buildings and structures in Tottori Prefecture
History of Tottori Prefecture
Daisen, Tottori
Yonago, Tottori